Anguina balsamophila is a plant pathogenic nematode in mules ear (Wyethia mollis).

References 

Agricultural pest nematodes
Tylenchida